The Wizard of Oz is a 1933 Canadian-American animated short film directed by Ted Eshbaugh.  The story is credited to "Col. Frank Baum."  Frank Joslyn Baum, a lieutenant colonel in the United States Army and eldest son of writer L. Frank Baum, was involved in the film's production, and may have had an involvement in the film's script, which is loosely inspired by the elder Baum's 1900 novel, The Wonderful Wizard of Oz.  It runs approximately eight and a half minutes and is nearly wordless, working mainly with arrangements of classical music created by Carl W. Stalling.

Production
The film was originally made in Technicolor, but because it was made without proper licensing from the Technicolor Corporation (which limited use of its 3-strip process to Disney), it never received a theatrical release in color, but was released in Black & White instead.

Plot summary
A tornado sweeps through the plains of Kansas, lifting Dorothy and Toto. The two tumble into Oz, landing on the Scarecrow. After freeing him from his pole, the trio stroll together, soon finding a Tin Woodman and oiling him.

After the four watch mating rituals of various animals set to strains of Camille Saint-Saëns's "The Swan", they are welcomed into the Emerald City. Suits of armor sing to them, "Hail to the Wizard of Oz! To the Wizard of Oz we lead the way!" A creature resembling the A-B-Sea Serpent of The Royal Book of Oz extends itself as stairsteps for Dorothy to enter the coach.

The Wizard is a cackling white-bearded man in a starry black robe and conical hat who produces custom seats for each of the four nervous travelers, including one for Toto (the Toto chair is mostly cut out of the frame in most video versions, but is later shown in a full shot of Toto sitting). He proceeds to perform magic with a hen and eggs. These are variations on simple sleight of hand tricks involving making objects appear, but the hen is able to take the eggs back into her body.

Finally, the hen releases an egg that will not stop growing. The five try to fight it, with the Tin Woodman breaking his axe. Soon, though, the egg hatches, the hen takes the chick, and clucks out "Rock-a-bye Baby" as a chorus joins her.

Home video
There were many home media releases of the film, including Betamax, VHS, Laserdisc, CED, DVD, HD DVD and Blu-ray Disc, usually printed and shown in black-and-white, not technicolor. Cassette copies are usually at slow speeds, and often overexposed and poorly framed, while disc copies are all at faster speeds, and underexposed and correctly framed. The first known commercial release was in Canada in 1985, on Betamax, VHS and Laserdisc, through the efforts of Fred M. Meyer, longtime Secretary of The International Wizard of Oz Club. This is not an original color print, but has been colored to match the original intent of the filmmakers, which, as in the MGM film that followed, had the film go from black and white to color upon Dorothy's arrival in Oz. Cassette copies also contained a stray hair during the parade sequence, while the LaserDisc copies did not.

The short is included in the 2005 3-Disc Collector's Edition of the more popular 1939 feature film of the same name, while a brief 2-minute clip is included on the 1999 DVD release and as a bonus on the 1993 Ultimate Oz VHS and LaserDisc deluxe release.

The short was released again in 2010 as part of Mill Creek Entertainment's DVD compilation, 200 Classic Cartoons.

Thunderbean Animation has restored and remastered the cartoon, releasing it on Blu-ray and DVD as part of their 2014 compilation Technicolor Dreams and Black and White Nightmares.

References

External links
 
 The 1933 film on YouTube

1933 films
Animated films based on The Wizard of Oz
1933 animated films
Animated films without speech
Films scored by Carl Stalling
American animated short films
Canadian animated short films
1930s American films
1930s Canadian films